Gogoșu is a commune located in Mehedinți County, Oltenia, Romania. It is composed of four villages: Balta Verde, Burila Mică, Gogoșu and Ostrovu Mare.

References

Communes in Mehedinți County
Localities in Oltenia